The 2021 Liga de Elite was the 49th season of the Liga de Elite, the top Macanese league for association football clubs since its establishment in 1973. The season began on 12 March 2021 and ended on 14 November 2021.

League table

Results

See also
2021 Taça de Macau

References

External links
Macau Football Association 

Campeonato da 1ª Divisão do Futebol seasons
Macau
1